The 2019 Tianjin Tianhai F.C. season is Tianjin Tianhai's 3rd consecutive season in the Chinese Super League ever since it started back in the 2004 season and 3rd consecutive season in the top flight of Chinese football. This season Tianjin Tianhai participates in the Chinese Super League and Chinese FA Cup.

Transfers and loans

Squad

First team squad

Reserve squad
As of 16 July 2018

Squad statistics

Appearances and goals

|-
! colspan=14 style=background:#dcdcdc; text-align:center| Players transferred out during the season

Disciplinary Record

Friendlies

Pre-season

Competitions

Chinese Super League

Table

Results summary

Results by round

Matches
All times are local (UTC+8).

Source:

Chinese FA Cup

References

Tianjin Tianhai F.C. seasons
Tianjin